The following notable companies manufacture Network-attached Storage devices.

See also

 File area network
 Disk enclosure
 Network architecture
 Global Namespace
 Server (computing)

References

 
Computer storage companies
Network-attached storage